Dagmar Maalstad (3 April 1902 - 27 June 2000) was a Norwegian politician for the Conservative Party.

From 1935 to 1948 she led the Norwegian Girl Guide Organization.

She served as a deputy representative to the Norwegian Parliament from Hordaland during the term 1958–1961.

References

1902 births
2000 deaths
Conservative Party (Norway) politicians
Deputy members of the Storting
Hordaland politicians
Women members of the Storting
20th-century Norwegian women politicians
20th-century Norwegian politicians